John McCarthy may refer to:

Government 
 John George MacCarthy (1829–1892), Member of Parliament for Mallow constituency, 1874–1880
 John McCarthy (Irish politician) (1862–1893), Member of Parliament for the Mid Tipperary constituency, 1892–1893
 John H. McCarthy (1850–1908), U.S. Representative from New York
 John McCarthy (Nebraska politician) (1857–1943), Nebraska Republican politician
 John F. McCarthy (1924–1981), California Republican senator
 John J. McCarthy (New Jersey politician) (1927–2001), New Jersey General Assembly member
 John V. McCarthy (c. 1932–1987), member of the Ohio House of Representatives
 John Thomas McCarthy (born 1939), U.S. ambassador
 John McCarthy (Australian diplomat) (born 1942), Australian ambassador to Vietnam, Mexico, Thailand, the United States, Indonesia, India and Japan
 John A. McCarthy (born 1947), Australian ambassador to the Holy See (2012–2016)
 John Keith McCarthy (1905–1976), Australian public servant in the Territory of Papua and New Guinea

Humanity and science 
 John McCarthy (computer scientist) (1927–2011), American computer scientist
 John McCarthy (linguist) (born 1953), American phonologist
 John D. McCarthy (born 1940), American sociologist
 John McCarthy (mathematician) (born 1964), mathematician
 John F. McCarthy Jr., American scientist and engineer

Sports 
 John McCarthy (American football) (1916–1998), American football player
 John McCarthy (referee) (born 1962), mixed martial arts referee
 Johnny McCarthy (1934–2020), American basketball player and coach
 Johnny McCarthy (baseball) (1910–1973), American baseball player
 John McCarthy (Gaelic footballer) (born 1955), former Dublin Gaelic footballer
 John McCarthy (ice hockey) (born 1986), American ice hockey player and coach
 John McCarthy (athlete), Paralympic athlete from Ireland
 John McCarthy (soccer) (born 1992), American soccer player
 John McCarthy (Australian rules footballer, born 1967), former player with Fitzroy and North Melbourne
 John McCarthy (Australian rules footballer, born 1989) (1989–2012), Port Adelaide and Collingwood player

Religious states
 John E. McCarthy (1930–2018), Roman Catholic bishop of the Diocese of Austin
 John McCarthy (Irish bishop) (1815–1893), bishop of Cloyne
 John McCarthy (Australian bishop), bishop of Sandhurst in Victoria, Australia
 John McCarthy (priest) (born 1938), Dean of Clogher, 1989–1994
 John Joseph McCarthy (1896–1983), Irish-born bishop to Nairobi, Kenya

Musicians
 John McCarthy (guitarist), guitarist
 John McCarthy (composer) (born 1961), Canadian composer
 John McCarthy (conductor) (1916–2009), conductor of choral music

Others 
 John McCarthy (journalist) (born 1956), British hostage and journalist 
 John McCarthy Jr. (1912–1994), Oscar-nominated set decorator
 John Edward McCarthy (1911–1977), American radio personality
 John P. McCarthy (1884–1962), American director and screenwriter

See also
 Jack McCarthy (disambiguation)
 Jon McCarthy (born 1970), English former professional footballer 
 John McCarty (disambiguation)